Stephen Frank Welton (born February 1961) is the founder and Executive Chairman of the Business Growth Fund (BGF).

Early life and education 
Welton was born South Africa. He and his family moved back to the UK when he was 11 years old.

Welton attended Esher College. He graduated with a law degree from Durham University in 1983. He initially trained as a barrister, before becoming a loan officer at the Bank of Boston.

Career 
Welton was one of the founding partners of private equity firm CCMP Capital Advisors, JP Morgan's private equity arm.

He was later managing director of Barclays Private Equity and co-founded Henderson Ventures.

Welton is the founder and first chief executive of BGF; an investment company set up in 2011 by five UK banks – HSBC, Lloyds, Barclays, RBS and Standard Chartered – in the wake of the 2008 financial crisis.

By 2018, BGF had reportedly invested £1.5 billion in 220 start-ups over the previous eight years. Welton became the investor's Executive Chairman in 2020.

In 2021, Welton joined the Build Back Better Council, a Government business council launched by Boris Johnson to address the UK’s economic recovery from the COVID-19 pandemic.

References 

1961 births
Living people
British businesspeople
Alumni of Hatfield College, Durham